This is a list of Iowa state forests.

See also
 List of U.S. National Forests

External links
DNR: Iowa State Forests

 
Iowa
State forests